FatFace is a British lifestyle brand, based in Hampshire, which creates product ranges across women's, men's, kids, footwear and accessories. FatFace is a multichannel retailer, with an international digital business as well as over 180 stores in the UK, 20 stores in the US and an engaged social community.

History
The business was founded in 1988 in French ski resort Méribel by Tim Slade, a former policeman, and business graduate Jules Leaver. The pair bought T-shirts wholesale, had them printed with designs specific to the resort, and sold them to other skiers on the slopes - at first using the proceeds only to fund their own skiing. They spent the following years travelling to different ski resorts, where they continued to produce and sell ski and outdoor-related clothing. In 1993 they opened their first shop, on London's Fulham Road; they named it "FatFace" after the Face de Bellevarde slope in Val-d'Isère.  In 2000, they sold 40% of the company to Livingbridge for £5 million. In 2005 Advent International, a private equity company, bought Livingbridge's interest in FatFace.

In 2007 FatFace was acquired, for £360 million, by private equity group Bridgepoint Capital; the sale netted Slade and Leaver £90 million. The company's sales were badly hit by the Great Recession, forcing Bridgepoint to write off half the company's value, but improved in 2010 and again in 2011, and FatFace returned to a small profit in 2012. Bridgepoint planned to float a quarter of the company on the London stock exchange in 2014, hoping to raise £110 million, but later cancelled the flotation due to lack of confidence by prospective stockholders.

In September 2020, FatFace announced the completion of a lender led debt and capital restructuring of Fat Face Group Borrowings Limited (the "Fat Face Group"). Following the restructuring there was a change of control of the parent company of the FatFace Group ("FatFace" or "Company"), to Fulham Parent Limited. As a result of the restructuring, FatFace's ownership has changed hands from its majority shareholder, Bridgepoint, to the group's lenders through its newly formed parent company. As part of the restructure the debt profile of the Group significantly reduced, from loans and borrowings (excluding lease liabilities) with a face value of £172.4m at the completion date, to £25.6m at the period end with expiry dates between September 2023 and May 2024.

In March 2021 FatFace revealed to customers and staff that they had been subject to a ransomware attack in January 2021 and paid $2 million ransom to Conti cyber criminals to unlock encrypted data.

In September 2021, Liz Evans stepped down as CEO and was replaced by Will Crumbie. At that point, Crumbie had been with the business for eight years as CFO. Before FatFace he held senior financial and executive positions within the Walgreen Boots Alliance Group and P&O. Colin Porter is the Chairman.

References

External links
 Official FatFace website
 Official FatFace US website

Clothing retailers of the United Kingdom
Retail companies established in 1988
British brands
Cyberattacks
Data breaches
Hacking in the 2020s